Julie Banderas (born Julie Bidwell;) is an American television news anchor for the Fox News Channel. She later took the professional name Banderas. She hosted Fox Report Weekend before moving to a weekday anchor role, and currently serves as a primary weekday fill-in anchor on programs such as America's Newsroom, The Faulkner Focus, Outnumbered as well as a guest host on The Big Saturday/Sunday Show. She is also a regular guest on Fox News' late night comedy show Gutfeld!.

Early life
Banderas is the daughter of Fabiola R. and Howard Dexter Bidwell (1930–2010). Her mother is an immigrant from Colombia; her father was a Navy veteran and civil engineer who started a company called Consolidated Precast, Inc. Banderas has a sister and four half siblings from her father's first marriage. She graduated with a bachelor's degree from Emerson College.

Career
Banderas began her career at WLVI-TV in Boston. She went on to serve as a local news anchorwoman for WHSV-TV in Harrisonburg, Virginia; WBRE-TV in Wilkes-Barre, Pennsylvania; WFSB-TV in Hartford, Connecticut and WNYW in New York City.

She joined Fox News in March 2005 as a general-assignment reporter.

In 2008, she replaced Laurie Dhue as the anchor for Fox Report Weekend. In 2010, she took maternity leave with Harris Faulkner assuming her responsibilities. She returned to Fox News from leave near the end of 2010 and was reassigned to the position of general news correspondent.

In June 2006, she gained international media attention for an on-air clash with Shirley Phelps-Roper, former spokeswoman for the Westboro Baptist Church, about which she later stated, "These people should be arrested, and I understand the right to protest, but when you disgrace not only our fallen soldiers, but when you disgrace innocent young children, I swear. Lock 'em up. Throw away the key. Give 'em the death penalty. I think it's disgusting."

Personal life
Banderas' former husband Andrew J. Sansone, a member of the board of directors of Habitat for Humanity and founding president of both Old Rock Media and Big Apple Channel, proposed marriage to her with a message-in-a-bottle that he pretended to discover on the beach while clam digging on Long Island Sound. She announced their engagement during an episode of America's Election Headquarters on September 21, 2008. They wed at Fifth Avenue Presbyterian Church on August 29, 2009. They have three children and reside in New York City.

In December 2022, Banderas announced on her Twitter account that she and Sansone had separated. Saying that he is her "soon to be ex."

On February 9, 2023, Banderas announced on Fox's Gutfeld! that she is getting a divorce.

See also

 New Yorkers in journalism

Notes

References

External links 

 Julie Banderas at FoxNews.com
 

1970s births
Place of birth missing (living people)
Year of birth missing (living people)
Living people
American people of Colombian descent
American television reporters and correspondents
American television news anchors
American women television journalists
Emerson College alumni
Fox News people
Hispanic and Latino American women journalists
People from Boston
People from Hartford, Connecticut
21st-century American women
Colombian American
Colombian journalists
American journalists
Latino conservatism in the United States